Saint-Didier-sous-Riverie (literally Saint-Didier under Riverie) is a former commune in the Rhône department in eastern France. On 1 January 2017, it was merged into the new commune Chabanière.

See also
Communes of the Rhône department

References

Former communes of Rhône (department)